The VOLTEX International Inc. is an American company based in Paramount, California that specializes in design, development and distribution of signaling devices for the fire and rescue, law enforcement, security enforcement, roadside construction and towing industries globally.

Established in 2006, VOLTEX International Inc. and VOLTEX Light Bar company has grown significantly in the US market and expanding globally since 2009 with distribution and manufacturing capabilities in 5 continents throughout the world.

Subsidiary
VOLTEX Light Bars and VOLTEX Arrow Boards, VOLTEX OEM Headlights, VOLTEXLIGHTS.COM and NSE National Safety Equipment Company manufacturer of hand built roadside arrow boards

Specialty
VOLTEX specializes in all kinds of emergency vehicle lighting, light bars and other electronic products and has numerous patents and trademarks registered globally. VOLTEX is also very aggressive within the e-commerce online environment.

References

Emergency vehicles
Companies based in Los Angeles County, California
Manufacturing companies based in California
Paramount, California
Manufacturing companies established in 2006
American companies established in 2006